Bursanthus is a genus of cnidarians belonging to the family Cerianthidae.

The species of this genus are found in Africa.

Species:
 Bursanthus bamfordi Leloup, 1968

References

Cerianthidae
Anthozoa genera